Eskimo is an exonym used to refer to two closely related Indigenous peoples: the Inuit (including the Alaska Native Iñupiat, the Greenlandic Inuit, and the Canadian Inuit) and the Yupik (or Yuit) of eastern Siberia and Alaska. A related third group, the Aleut, which inhabit the Aleutian Islands, are generally excluded from the definition of Eskimo. The three groups share a relatively recent common ancestor, and speak related languages belonging to the Eskaleut language family.

These circumpolar peoples have traditionally inhabited the Arctic and subarctic regions from eastern Siberia (Russia) to Alaska (United States), Northern Canada, Nunavik, Nunatsiavut, and Greenland.

Many Inuit, Yupik, Aleut, and other individuals consider the term Eskimo, which is of a disputed etymology, to be unacceptable and even pejorative. Eskimo continues to be used within a historical, linguistic, archaeological, and cultural context. The governments in Canada and the United States have made moves to cease using the term Eskimo in official documents, but it has not been eliminated, as the word is in some places written into tribal, and therefore national, legal terminology. Canada officially uses the term Inuit to describe the indigenous Canadian people who are living in the country's northern sectors and are not First Nations or Métis. The United States government legally uses Alaska Native for Native Alaskans including the Yupik, Inuit, and Aleut, but also for non-Eskimo Native Alaskans including the Tlingit, the Haida, the Eyak, and the Tsimshian, in addition to at least nine separate northern Athabaskan/Dene peoples. The designation Alaska Native applies to enrolled tribal members only, in contrast to individual Eskimo/Aleut persons claiming descent from the world's "most widespread aboriginal group". 

There are between 171,000 and 187,000 Inuit and Yupik, the majority of whom live in or near their traditional circumpolar homeland. Of these, 53,785 (2010) live in the United States, 65,025 (2016) in Canada, and 51,730 (2021) in Greenland. In addition, 16,730 people living in Denmark were born in Greenland, and an unknown number are Siberians. The non-governmental organization (NGO) known as the Inuit Circumpolar Council claims to represent 180,000 people.

The non-Inuit sub-branch of the Eskimo branch of the Eskaleut language family consists of four distinct Yupik languages, two of them are used in the Russian Far East as well as on St. Lawrence Island, and two of them are used in western Alaska, southwestern Alaska, and the western part of Southcentral Alaska. The extinct language of the Sirenik people is sometimes claimed to be related to these other languages.

Nomenclature

Etymology 

A variety of theories have been postulated for the etymological origin of the word Eskimo. According to Smithsonian linguist Ives Goddard, etymologically the word derives from the Innu-aimun (Montagnais) word ayas̆kimew, meaning "a person who laces a snowshoe", and is related to husky (a breed of dog). The word assime·w means "she laces a snowshoe" in Innu, and Innu language speakers refer to the neighbouring Mi'kmaq people using words that sound like eskimo. This interpretation is generally confirmed by more recent academic sources.

In 1978, José Mailhot, a Quebec anthropologist who speaks Innu-aimun (Montagnais), published a paper suggesting that Eskimo meant "people who speak a different language". French traders who encountered the Innu (Montagnais) in the eastern areas adopted their word for the more western peoples and spelled it as Esquimau or Esquimaux in a transliteration.

Some people consider Eskimo offensive, because it is popularly perceived to mean "eaters of raw meat" in Algonquian languages common to people along the Atlantic coast. An unnamed Cree speaker suggested the original word that became corrupted to Eskimo might have been askamiciw (meaning "he eats it raw"); the Inuit are referred to in some Cree texts as askipiw (meaning "eats something raw"). Regardless, the term still carries a derogatory connotation for many Inuit and Yupik.

One of the first printed uses of the French word Esquimaux comes from Samuel Hearne's A Journey from Prince of Wales's Fort in Hudson's Bay to the Northern Ocean in the Years 1769, 1770, 1771, 1772 first published in 1795.

Usage

The term Eskimo is still used by people to encompass the Inuit and Yupik, as well as other Indigenous or Alaska Native and Siberian peoples. In the 21st century, usage in North America has declined. Linguistic, ethnic, and cultural differences exist between Yupik and Inuit.

In Canada and Greenland, and to a certain extent in Alaska, the term Eskimo is predominantly seen as offensive and has been widely replaced by the term Inuit or terms specific to a particular group or community. This has resulted in a trend whereby some Canadians and Americans believe that they should use Inuit even for Yupik who are non-Inuit.

The Inuit of Greenland generally refer to themselves as Greenlanders ("Kalaallit" or "Grønlændere") and speak the Greenlandic language and Danish. The Inuit of Greenland belong to three groups: the Kalaallit of west Greenland, who speak Kalaallisut; the Tunumiit of Tunu (east Greenland), who speak Tunumiit oraasiat ("East Greenlandic"); and the Inughuit of north Greenland, who speak Inuktun.

The word "Eskimo" is a racially charged term in Canada. In Canada's Central Arctic, Inuinnaq is the preferred term, and in the eastern Canadian Arctic Inuit. The language is often called Inuktitut, though other local designations are also used.

Section 25 of the Canadian Charter of Rights and Freedoms and section 35 of the Canadian Constitution Act of 1982 recognized the Inuit as a distinctive group of Aboriginal peoples in Canada. Although Inuit can be applied to all of the Eskimo peoples in Canada and Greenland, that is not true in Alaska and Siberia. In Alaska, the term Eskimo is still used because it includes both Iñupiat (singular: Iñupiaq), who are Inuit, and Yupik, who are not.

The term Alaska Native is inclusive of (and under U.S. and Alaskan law, as well as the linguistic and cultural legacy of Alaska, refers to) all Indigenous peoples of Alaska, including not only the Iñupiat (Alaskan Inuit) and the Yupik, but also groups such as the Aleut, who share a recent ancestor, as well as the largely unrelated indigenous peoples of the Pacific Northwest Coast and the Alaskan Athabaskans, such as the Eyak people. The term Alaska Native has important legal usage in Alaska and the rest of the United States as a result of the Alaska Native Claims Settlement Act of 1971. It does not apply to Inuit or Yupik originating outside the state. As a result, the term Eskimo is still in use in Alaska. Alternative terms, such as Inuit-Yupik, have been proposed, but none has gained widespread acceptance. Early 21st century population estimates registered more than 135,000 individuals of Eskimo descent, with approximately 85,000 living in North America, 50,000 in Greenland, and the rest residing in Siberia.

Inuit Circumpolar Council 
In 1977, the Inuit Circumpolar Conference (ICC) meeting in Utqiaġvik, Alaska, officially adopted Inuit as a designation for all circumpolar Native peoples, regardless of their local view on an appropriate term. They voted to replace the word Eskimo with Inuit. Even at that time, such a designation was not accepted by all. As a result, the Canadian government usage has replaced the term Eskimo with Inuit (Inuk in singular).

The ICC charter defines Inuit as including "the Inupiat, Yupik (Alaska), Inuit, Inuvialuit (Canada), Kalaallit (Greenland) and Yupik (Russia)". Despite the ICC's 1977 decision to adopt the term Inuit, this has not been accepted by all or even most Yupik people.

In 2010, the ICC passed a resolution in which they implored scientists to use Inuit and Paleo-Inuit instead of Eskimo or Paleo-Eskimo.

Academic response
In a 2015 commentary in the journal Arctic, Canadian archaeologist Max Friesen argued fellow Arctic archaeologists should follow the ICC and use Paleo-Inuit instead of Paleo-Eskimo. In 2016, Lisa Hodgetts and Arctic editor Patricia Wells wrote: "In the Canadian context, continued use of any term that incorporates Eskimo is potentially harmful to the relationships between archaeologists and the Inuit and Inuvialuit communities who are our hosts and increasingly our research partners."

Hodgetts and Wells suggested using more specific terms when possible (e.g., Dorset and Groswater) and agreed with Frieson in using the Inuit tradition to replace Neo-Eskimo, although they noted replacement for Palaeoeskimo was still an open question and discussed Paleo-Inuit, Arctic Small Tool Tradition, and pre-Inuit, as well as Inuktitut loanwords like Tuniit and Sivullirmiut, as possibilities.

In 2020, Katelyn Braymer-Hayes and colleagues argued in the Journal of Anthropological Archaeology that there is a "clear need" to replace the terms Neo-Eskimo and Paleo-Eskimo, citing the ICC resolution, but finding a consensus within the Alaskan context particularly is difficult, since Alaska Natives do not use the word Inuit to describe themselves nor is the term legally applicable only to Iñupiat and Yupik in Alaska, and as such, terms used in Canada like Paleo Inuit and Ancestral Inuit would not be acceptable.

American linguist Lenore Grenoble has also explicitly deferred to the ICC resolution and used Inuit–Yupik instead of Eskimo with regards to the language branch.

History
Genetic evidence suggests that the Americas were populated from northeastern Asia in multiple waves. While the great majority of indigenous American peoples can be traced to a single early migration of Paleo-Indians, the Na-Dené, Inuit and Indigenous Alaskan populations exhibit admixture from distinct populations that migrated into America at a later date and are closely linked to the peoples of far northeastern Asia (e.g. Chukchi), and only more remotely to the majority indigenous American type. For modern Eskimo–Aleut speakers, this later ancestral component makes up almost half of their genomes. The ancient Paleo-Eskimo population was genetically distinct from the modern circumpolar populations, but eventually derives from the same far northeastern Asian cluster. It is believed that ancestors of the Aleut people inhabited the Aleutian Chain 10,000 years ago.
 

The earliest positively identified Paleo-Eskimo cultures (Early Paleo-Eskimo) date to 5,000 years ago. Several earlier indigenous peoples existed in the northern circumpolar regions of eastern Siberia, Alaska, and Canada (although probably not in Greenland). The Paleo-Eskimo peoples appear to have developed in Alaska from people related to the Arctic small tool tradition in eastern Asia, whose ancestors had probably migrated to Alaska at least 3,000 to 5,000 years earlier.

The Yupik languages and cultures in Alaska evolved in place, beginning with the original pre-Dorset Indigenous culture developed in Alaska. At least 4,000 years ago, the Unangan culture of the Aleut became distinct. It is not generally considered an Eskimo culture.  However, there is some possibility of an Aleutian origin of the Dorset people, who in turn are a likely ancestor of today's Inuit and Yupik.

Approximately 1,500 to 2,000 years ago, apparently in northwestern Alaska, two other distinct variations appeared. Inuit language became distinct and, over a period of several centuries, its speakers migrated across northern Alaska, through Canada, and into Greenland. The distinct culture of the Thule people (drawing strongly from the Birnirk culture) developed in northwestern Alaska. It very quickly spread over the entire area occupied by Eskimo peoples, though it was not necessarily adopted by all of them.

Languages

Language family

The Eskimo–Aleut family of languages includes two cognate branches: the Aleut (Unangan) branch and the Eskimo branch.

The number of cases varies, with Aleut languages having a greatly reduced case system compared to those of the Eskimo subfamily. Eskimo–Aleut languages possess voiceless plosives at the bilabial, coronal, velar and uvular positions in all languages except Aleut, which has lost the bilabial stops but retained the nasal. In the Eskimo subfamily a voiceless alveolar lateral fricative is also present.

The Eskimo sub-family consists of the Inuit language and Yupik language sub-groups. The Sirenikski language, which is virtually extinct, is sometimes regarded as a third branch of the Eskimo language family. Other sources regard it as a group belonging to the Yupik branch.

Inuit languages comprise a dialect continuum, or dialect chain, that stretches from Unalakleet and Norton Sound in Alaska, across northern Alaska and Canada, and east to Greenland. Changes from western (Iñupiaq) to eastern dialects are marked by the dropping of vestigial Yupik-related features, increasing consonant assimilation (e.g., kumlu, meaning "thumb", changes to kuvlu, changes to kublu, changes to kulluk, changes to kulluq,) and increased consonant lengthening, and lexical change. Thus, speakers of two adjacent Inuit dialects would usually be able to understand one another, but speakers from dialects distant from each other on the dialect continuum would have difficulty understanding one another. Seward Peninsula dialects in western Alaska, where much of the Iñupiat culture has been in place for perhaps less than 500 years, are greatly affected by phonological influence from the Yupik languages. Eastern Greenlandic, at the opposite end of the Inuit range, has had significant word replacement due to a unique form of ritual name avoidance.

Ethnographically, Inuit of Greenland belong to three groups: the Kalaallit of west Greenland, who speak Kalaallisut; the Tunumiit of Tunu (east Greenland), who speak Tunumiit oraasiat ("East Greenlandic"), and the Inughuit of north Greenland, who speak Inuktun.

The four Yupik languages, by contrast, including Alutiiq (Sugpiaq), Central Alaskan Yup'ik, Naukan (Naukanski), and Siberian Yupik, are distinct languages with phonological, morphological, and lexical differences. They demonstrate limited mutual intelligibility. Additionally, both Alutiiq and Central Yup'ik have considerable dialect diversity. The northernmost Yupik languages – Siberian Yupik and Naukan Yupik – are linguistically only slightly closer to Inuit than is Alutiiq, which is the southernmost of the Yupik languages. Although the grammatical structures of Yupik and Inuit languages are similar, they have pronounced differences phonologically. Differences of vocabulary between Inuit and any one of the Yupik languages are greater than between any two Yupik languages. Even the dialectal differences within Alutiiq and Central Alaskan Yup'ik sometimes are relatively great for locations that are relatively close geographically.

Despite the relatively small population of Naukan speakers, documentation of the language dates back to 1732. While Naukan is only spoken in Siberia, the language acts as an intermediate between two Alaskan languages: Siberian Yupik Eskimo and Central Yup'ik Eskimo.

The Sirenikski language is sometimes regarded as a third branch of the Eskimo language family, but other sources regard it as a group belonging to the Yupik branch.

An overview of the Eskimo–Aleut languages family is given below:
Aleut
Aleut language
Western-Central dialects: Atkan, Attuan, Unangan, Bering (60–80 speakers)
Eastern dialect: Unalaskan, Pribilof (400 speakers)
Eskimo (Yup'ik, Yuit, and Inuit)
Yupik
Central Alaskan Yup'ik (10,000 speakers)
Alutiiq or Pacific Gulf Yup'ik (400 speakers)
Central Siberian Yupik or Yuit (Chaplinon and St Lawrence Island, 1,400 speakers)
Naukan (700 speakers)
Inuit or Inupik (75,000 speakers)
Iñupiaq (northern Alaska, 3,500 speakers)
Inuvialuktun (western Canada; together with Siglitun, Natsilingmiutut, Inuinnaqtun and Uummarmiutun 765 speakers)
Inuktitut (eastern Canada; together with Inuktun and Inuinnaqtun, 30,000 speakers)
Kalaallisut (Greenlandic (Greenland, 47,000 speakers)
Inuktun (Avanersuarmiutut, Thule dialect or Polar Eskimo, approximately 1,000 speakers)
Tunumiit oraasiat (East Greenlandic known as Tunumiisut, 3,500 speakers)
Sirenik Eskimo language (Sirenikskiy) (extinct)

American linguist Lenore Grenoble has explicitly deferred to this resolution and used Inuit–Yupik instead of Eskimo with regards to the language branch.

Words for snow

There has been a long-running linguistic debate about whether or not the speakers of the Eskimo-Aleut language group have an unusually large number of words for snow.  The general modern consensus is that, in multiple Eskimo languages, there are, or have been in simultaneous usage, indeed fifty plus words for snow.

Diet

Inuit

The Inuit inhabit the Arctic and northern Bering Sea coasts of Alaska in the United States, and Arctic coasts of the Northwest Territories, Nunavut, Quebec, and Labrador in Canada, and Greenland (associated with Denmark). Until fairly recent times, there has been a remarkable homogeneity in the culture throughout this area, which traditionally relied on fish, marine mammals, and land animals for food, heat, light, clothing, and tools. Their food sources primarily relied on seals, whales, whale blubber, walrus, and fish, all of which they hunted using harpoons on the ice. Clothing consisted of robes made of wolfskin and reindeer skin to acclimate to the low temperatures. They maintain a unique Inuit culture.

Greenland's Inuit

Greenlandic Inuit make up 90% of Greenland's population. They belong to three major groups:
 Kalaallit of west Greenland, who speak Kalaallisut
 Tunumiit of east Greenland, who speak Tunumiisut
 Inughuit of north Greenland, who speak Inuktun or Polar Eskimo.

Canadian Inuit

Canadian Inuit live primarily in Inuit Nunangat (lit. "lands, waters and ices of the [Inuit] people"), their traditional homeland although some people live in southern parts of Canada. Inuit Nunangat ranges from the Yukon–Alaska border in the west across the Arctic to northern Labrador.

The Inuvialuit live in the Inuvialuit Settlement Region, the northern part of Yukon and the Northwest Territories, which stretches to the Amundsen Gulf and the Nunavut border and includes the western Canadian Arctic Islands. The land was demarked in 1984 by the Inuvialuit Final Agreement.

The majority of Inuit live in Nunavut (a territory of Canada), Nunavik (the northern part of Quebec) and in Nunatsiavut (the Inuit settlement region in Labrador).

Alaska's Iñupiat

The Iñupiat are the Inuit of Alaska's Northwest Arctic and North Slope boroughs and the Bering Straits region, including the Seward Peninsula. Utqiaġvik, the northernmost city in the United States, is above the Arctic Circle and in the Iñupiat region. Their language is known as Iñupiaq. Their current communities include 34 villages across Iñupiat Nunaŋat (Iñupiaq lands) including seven Alaskan villages in the North Slope Borough, affiliated with the Arctic Slope Regional Corporation; eleven villages in Northwest Arctic Borough; and sixteen villages affiliated with the Bering Straits Regional Corporation.

Yupik

The Yupik are indigenous or aboriginal peoples who live along the coast of western Alaska, especially on the Yukon-Kuskokwim delta and along the Kuskokwim River (Central Alaskan Yup'ik); in southern Alaska (the Alutiiq); and along the eastern coast of Chukotka in the Russian Far East and St. Lawrence Island in western Alaska (the Siberian Yupik). The Yupik economy has traditionally been strongly dominated by the harvest of marine mammals, especially seals, walrus, and whales.

Alutiiq

The Alutiiq language is relatively close to that spoken by the Yupik in the Bethel, Alaska area. But, it is considered a distinct language with two major dialects: the Koniag dialect, spoken on the Alaska Peninsula and on Kodiak Island, and the Chugach dialect, spoken on the southern Kenai Peninsula and in Prince William Sound. Residents of Nanwalek, located on southern part of the Kenai Peninsula near Seldovia, speak what they call Sugpiaq. They are able to understand those who speak Yupik in Bethel. With a population of approximately 3,000, and the number of speakers in the hundreds, Alutiiq communities are working to revitalize their language.

Central Alaskan Yup'ik

Yup'ik, with an apostrophe, denotes the speakers of the Central Alaskan Yup'ik language, who live in western Alaska and southwestern Alaska from southern Norton Sound to the north side of Bristol Bay, on the Yukon–Kuskokwim Delta, and on Nelson Island. The use of the apostrophe in the name Yup'ik is a written convention to denote the long pronunciation of the p sound; but it is spoken the same in other Yupik languages. Of all the Alaska Native languages, Central Alaskan Yup'ik has the most speakers, with about 10,000 of a total Yup'ik population of 21,000 still speaking the language. The five dialects of Central Alaskan Yup'ik include General Central Yup'ik, and the Egegik, Norton Sound, Hooper Bay-Chevak, and Nunivak dialects. In the latter two dialects, both the language and the people are called Cup'ik.

Siberian Yupik

Siberian Yupik reside along the Bering Sea coast of the Chukchi Peninsula in Siberia in the Russian Far East and in the villages of Gambell and Savoonga on St. Lawrence Island in Alaska. The Central Siberian Yupik spoken on the Chukchi Peninsula and on St. Lawrence Island is nearly identical. About 1,050 of a total Alaska population of 1,100 Siberian Yupik people in Alaska speak the language. It is the first language of the home for most St. Lawrence Island children. In Siberia, about 300 of a total of 900 Siberian Yupik people still learn and study the language, though it is no longer learned as a first language by children.

Naukan

About 70 of 400 Naukan people still speak Naukanski. The Naukan originate on the Chukot Peninsula in Chukotka Autonomous Okrug in Siberia. Despite the relatively small population of Naukan speakers, documentation of the language dates back to 1732. While Naukan is only spoken in Siberia, the language acts as an intermediate between two Alaskan languages: Siberian Yupik Eskimo and Central Yup'ik Eskimo.

Sirenik Eskimos

Some speakers of Siberian Yupik languages used to speak an Eskimo variant in the past, before they underwent a language shift. These former speakers of Sirenik Eskimo language inhabited the settlements of Sireniki, Imtuk, and some small villages stretching to the west from Sireniki along south-eastern coasts of Chukchi Peninsula. They lived in neighborhoods with Siberian Yupik and Chukchi peoples.

As early as in 1895, Imtuk was a settlement with a mixed population of Sirenik Eskimos and Ungazigmit (the latter belonging to Siberian Yupik). Sirenik Eskimo culture has been influenced by that of Chukchi, and the language shows Chukchi language influences. Folktale motifs also show the influence of Chuckchi culture.

The above peculiarities of this (already extinct) Eskimo language amounted to mutual unintelligibility even with its nearest language relatives: in the past, Sirenik Eskimos had to use the unrelated Chukchi language as a lingua franca for communicating with Siberian Yupik.

Many words are formed from entirely different roots from in Siberian Yupik, but even the grammar has several peculiarities distinct not only among Eskimo languages, but even compared to Aleut. For example, dual number is not known in Sirenik Eskimo, while most Eskimo–Aleut languages have dual, including its neighboring Siberian Yupikax relatives.

Little is known about the origin of this diversity. The peculiarities of this language may be the result of a supposed long isolation from other Eskimo groups, and being in contact only with speakers of unrelated languages for many centuries. The influence of the Chukchi language is clear.

Because of all these factors, the classification of Sireniki Eskimo language is not settled yet: Sireniki language is sometimes regarded as a third branch of Eskimo (at least, its possibility is mentioned). Sometimes it is regarded rather as a group belonging to the Yupik branch.

See also

 Alaska Native religion
 Blond Eskimos
 Disc number
 Eskimo archery
 Eskimo kinship
 Eskimo kissing
 Eskimo yo-yo
 Eskimology
 Inuit religion
 Kudlik
 Maupuk
 Nanook of the North, 1922 documentary
 Saqqaq culture

Citations

General and cited sources 
 
 
 Nuttall, Mark. Encyclopedia of the Arctic. New York: Routledge, 2005. .

Cyrillic

Further reading
 Adapting to climate change: social-ecological resilience in a Canadian western arctic community. Conservation Ecology 5(2)
 Canadian Council on Learning, State of Inuit Learning in Canada
 Contemporary Food Sharing: A Case Study from Akulivik, PQ. Canada.
 Internet Sacred Text Archive: Inuit Religion
 Inuit Culture
 Inuit Exposure to Organochlorines through the Aquatic Food Chain. Environmental Health Perspectives 101(7)
 Inuit Women and Graphic Arts: Female Creativity and Its Cultural Context. The Canadian Journal of Native Studies 9(2)
 We the People: American Indians and Alaska Natives in the United States. Census 2000 Special Reports February 2006
 University of Washington Libraries Digital Collections – Frank H. Nowell Photographs Photographs documenting scenery, towns, businesses, mining activities, Native Americans, and Eskimos in the vicinity of Nome, Alaska from 1901 to 1909.
 University of Washington Libraries Digital Collections – Alaska and Western Canada Collection Images documenting Alaska and Western Canada, primarily Yukon and British Columbia, depicting scenes of the Gold Rush of 1898, city street scenes, Eskimo and Native Americans of the region, hunting and fishing, and transportation.
 University of Washington Libraries Digital Collections – Arthur Churchill Warner Photographs Includes images of Eskimos from 1898 to 1900.
 Inuit Myopia: an environmentally induced "epidemic"?

External links

 Some Psychological Aspects of the Impact of the White Man upon the Labrador Eskimo Manuscript at Dartmouth College Library
 The Traditional Labrador Eskimos (1960) Manuscript at Dartmouth College Library
 Victor Levine Manuscripts on origins of the Eskimos at Dartmouth College Library

 
Algonquian ethnonyms
Ethnic groups in Russia
Hunter-gatherers of the Arctic
Hunter-gatherers of Asia
Hunter-gatherers of the United States
Hunter-gatherers of Canada
Indigenous peoples of North America
Indigenous small-numbered peoples of the North, Siberia and the Far East
Modern nomads